Route 351 is a Quebec provincial highway located in the Mauricie region. It runs from the junction of Route 153 in Saint-Barnabé and ends in Shawinigan also at a junction with Route 153 just south of the Autoroute 55 and Route 155 interchange. It also has a concurrency in Charette with Route 350.

Municipalities located along Route 351

 Saint-Barnabé
 Charette
 Saint-Élie
 Saint-Mathieu-du-Parc
 Shawinigan

Major intersections

See also

 List of Quebec provincial highways

References

External links 
 Transports Quebec Official Map 
 Route 351 on Google Maps

351
Transport in Shawinigan